The Strange–Rahman–Smith equation is used in the cryoporometry method of measuring porosity. 
NMR cryoporometry   is a recent technique for measuring total porosity and pore size distributions. NMRC is based on two equations: the Gibbs–Thomson equation, which maps the melting point depression to pore size, and the Strange–Rahman–Smith equation,  which maps the melted signal amplitude at a particular temperature to pore volume.

Equation

Where:	  is the Gibbs–Thomson coefficient for the liquid in the pores.

References

Equations of physics